The 1969 New Orleans Saints season was the team's third as a member of the National Football League. They improved on their previous season's output of 4–9–1, winning five games. The team failed to qualify for the playoffs for the third consecutive season. Tom Dempsey led the team in scoring with 99 points and was named to the Pro Bowl.

The 1969 Saints surrendered 7.90 yards per-pass-attempt (including quarterback sacks), an NFL record at the time for the Super Bowl Era, and third all-time as of 2012.

Offseason

NFL draft

Personnel

Staff

Roster

Schedule 

Note: Intra-division opponents are in bold text.

Standings

Season summary

Week 10 

NFL Films selected this matchup as the Game of the Week.

References 

New Orleans Saints seasons
New Orleans Saints
New Orl